The Diego Martin Highway is a highway in Trinidad and Tobago.  It runs west from Cocorite to Diamond Vale. The highway meets the Audrey Jeffers Highway in Cocorite and runs north-south to Wendy Fitzwillliam Boulevard in Diamond Vale. 

Roads in Trinidad and Tobago